The Solar One Ceylon Power Station is a 12.56-megawatt solar photovoltaic farm built in January 2017 at Welikanda, in the Polonnaruwa District of Sri Lanka. The solar farm utilizes 315W and 320W polycrystalline modules manufactured by JA Solar Holdings, which are installed over 624 single-axis solar trackers supplied by the Spanish firm Grupo Clavijo. The trackers are expected to boost production up by 20%, compared to a fixed tilt setup.

The facility took five months to build, and was ceremonially declared open by the Ministry of Power and Renewable Energy Ranjith Siyambalapitiya and deputy minister Ajith Perera. The solar farm is expected to produce approximately  annually.

See also 
 List of power stations in Sri Lanka

References

External links 
 

Solar power stations in Sri Lanka
Buildings and structures in Polonnaruwa District